Ough is a former unincorporated community in Dundy County, Nebraska, United States. All that is left at Ough today is a farmhouse and compound.

History
A post office was established at Ough in 1886, and remained in operation until it was discontinued in 1912.   The community hit a peak population of 25 in 1890.   It is named for John Ough, the first postmaster, and his three brothers.

References

Unincorporated communities in Dundy County, Nebraska
Unincorporated communities in Nebraska